Joel Awanka S. Kpoku (born 22 June 1999) is an English-born congolese rugby union lock for Lyon in the French Top 14

Kpoku began playing rugby at school and joined rugby league side London Skolars at 12 years old. He then joined Saracens Amateur RFC in 2013  before being selected to join Saracens academy at under-17s. He was called up for full  training in August 2018 after impressing in the 2018 World Rugby Under 20 Championship.

In February 2019 he was short listed for the Premiership Rugby Cup Breakthrough Player Award.

He committed his immediate future to Saracens in 2020 in a two-year deal that would see him promoted from the senior academy to the first team.

However, on 19 November 2021, Kpoku left Saracens with immediate effect to move to France to join Lyon in the Top 14 from the 2021-22 season.
Kpoku is said to have congolese heritage.

References

1999 births
Living people
English rugby union players
Rugby union locks
Rugby union players from London Borough of Newham
Saracens F.C. players
English expatriate rugby union players
English expatriate sportspeople in France
Expatriate rugby union players in France
Lyon OU players